João Luiz Ferreira Batista, known as João Luiz, is a Brazilian former association football player.  He spent one season in Major League Soccer.

In 1997, the MetroStars purchased Luiz’ contract from Vasco de Gama.  He played only seven games, spending most of the season on injury reserve.  The MetroStars released him at the end of the season.

References

External links
 
 MetroStars: Joao Luiz

Living people
1971 births
Brazilian footballers
Brazilian expatriate footballers
New York Red Bulls players
Association football defenders
Major League Soccer players